Fortune was a 36-gun fourth rate vessel captured from pirates or may have been in the service of Royalists by the Commonwealth of England, She was captured in 1652 as the 36-gun La Fortunnee. She was commissioned into the Parliamentary Naval Force as Fortune. She participated in the Battle of Dungeness and the Battle of Portland. She was sold 1654.

Fortune was the eighth named vessel since it was used for a 100-ton bm ship in service in 1512.

Specifications
Her dimensional data is unknown. Her gun armament was 36 guns. Her manning was 100 personnel.

Commissioned Service

Service in the Commonwealth Navy
She was commissioned into the Parliamentary Navy in 1652 under the command of Captain Anthony Spatchurst. Later in 1652 she was under command of Captain William Tatnell. She partook in the Battle of Dungeness on 30 November 1652 and the Battle of Portland from 18 to 20 February 1653. During the battle Captain Tatnell was killed. Later Captain Anthony Archer took command.

Disposition
Fortune was sold 1654.

Notes

Citations

References

 British Warships in the Age of Sail (1603 – 1714), by Rif Winfield, published by Seaforth Publishing, England © Rif Winfield 2009, EPUB :
 Fleet Actions, 1.4 Battle of Dungeness
 Fleet Actions, 1.5 Battle off Portland (the Three days' Battle)
 Chapter 4 Fourth Rates - 'Small Ships', Vessels acquired from 25 March 1603, Ex-French Prizes (1650-52), Fortune
 Ships of the Royal Navy, by J.J. Colledge, revised and updated by Lt-Cdr Ben Warlow and Steve Bush, published by Seaforth Publishing, Barnsley, Great Britain, © the estate of J.J. Colledge, Ben Warlow and Steve Bush 2020, EPUB , Section F (Fortune)
 The Arming and Fitting of English Ships of War 1600 - 1815, by Brian Lavery, published by US Naval Institute Press © Brian Lavery 1989, Part V Guns, Type of Guns

Ships of the line of the Royal Navy
1650s ships
Ships of the English navy